In 2004–05, the Gophers had an overall record of 36–2–2. Its mark in the WCHA was 25–1–2. Both totals established the most wins in a season and in conference action since the start of the Gophers program in 1997–98.  From the beginning of the season to the end, the Gophers were ranked No. 1. In addition, the Gophers were ranked in the top five in every statistical category, including winning percentage, power-play and offensive scoring.

Regular season
During the 2004–05 season, Krissy Wendell set an NCAA record (since tied) for most shorthanded goals in one season with 7. After graduating from Minnesota, she had the career record for most shorthanded goals in a career with 16. Ironically, both marks were tied by Meghan Agosta.
Krissy Wendell scored the game-winning goal in the 2005 WCHA championship game against Wisconsin. She followed that with a hat trick against ECAC champion Harvard. She was the NCAA runner-up in the scoring race to Gophers teammate Natalie Darwitz with 98 points.

Player stats

Skaters

Goaltenders

Postseason
The Gophers then went on to win their second straight WCHA Championship with a 3–2 overtime win over Wisconsin.
In the NCAA playoffs, the Gophers defeated the Providence Friars by a 6–1 score. With the win, the Gophers advanced to its fourth-straight NCAA Frozen Four appearance. The Gophers defeated the Dartmouth Big Green by a 7–2 score in the semifinal game. In the first period, the Gophers scored five goals in the first period. On March 27, the Gophers defeated the Harvard Crimson by a 4–3 mark to win their consecutive national championship.

Awards and honors
 Natalie Darwitz, Patty Kazmaier Award top three finalist
Laura Halldorson, WCHA Coach of the Year (her third award)
Krissy Wendell, Patty Kazmaier Award (Wendell became the first player from Minnesota, and the first from the WCHA to win the Patty Kazmaier Award)
 The Gophers had four players garner All-America honors, the most in a single season.

References

Minnesota
NCAA women's ice hockey Frozen Four seasons
NCAA women's ice hockey championship seasons
Minnesota Golden Gophers women's ice hockey seasons
Minn
Minne
Minne